The Republican Lieutenant Governors Association (RLGA) is a national organization in the U.S. whose mission is raising money and assisting Republicans in their campaigns for lieutenant governor.

See also
 National Lieutenant Governors Association
 Republican Governors Association

References

Republican Party (United States) organizations